The Noether Lecture is a distinguished lecture series that honors women "who have made fundamental and sustained contributions to the mathematical sciences". The Association for Women in Mathematics (AWM) established the annual lectures in 1980 as the Emmy Noether Lectures, in honor of one of the leading mathematicians of her time. In 2013 it was renamed the AWM-AMS Noether Lecture and since 2015 is sponsored jointly with the American Mathematical Society (AMS). The recipient delivers the lecture at the yearly American Joint Mathematics Meetings held in January.

The ICM Emmy Noether Lecture is an additional lecture series, sponsored by the International Mathematical Union. Beginning in 1994 this lecture was delivered at the International Congress of Mathematicians, held every four years. In 2010 the lecture series was made permanent.

The 2021 Noether Lecture was supposed to have been given by Andrea Bertozzi of UCLA, but it was cancelled  due to Bertozzi's connections to policing.
 The cancellation was made during the George Floyd protests: "This decision comes as many of this nation  rise up in protest over  racial discrimination and brutality by police".

Noether Lecturer

ICM Emmy Noether Lecturers

See also

 List of mathematics awards

References

External links
 

Lists of women scientists
Women in mathematics
Science awards honoring women
Awards and prizes of the Association for Women in Mathematics
Lecture series